State Highway 11 (SH 11)  is a highway that runs from US 59 (Future I-369) in Linden to SH 56 in Sherman in northeast Texas.

Route description
SH 11 begins at an intersection with State Highway 56 on the easternedge of Sherman, just north of the Sherman Regional Airport.  The route then travels to the southeast through Northeast Texas.  In 2009, it was rerouted around the city of Commerce, concurrent with State Highway 24 and State Loop 178, with the old routing through Commerce transferred to a business route.  It continues southeast toward Sulphur Springs, where it shares a concurrency with State Highway 154 and the old routing of US 67, and intersects I-30 on the south side of town.  After Sulphur Springs, the route takes a more easterly direction through Northeast Texas, before reaching its eastern terminus at US 59 (Future I-369) on the eastern edge of Linden.

History

State Highway 11 was one of the original twenty-five state highways proposed on June 21, 1917, overlaid on top of the Jefferson Highway. In 1917, the routing was proposed from the Oklahoma border at Denison, south on present day U.S. Highway 69 through Whitewright into Greenville.  From Greenville, it went east on U.S. Highway 67 to Mount Pleasant, and south on U.S. Highway 271 to Gilmer and along State Highway 300 to Longview, and finally, U.S. Highway 80 through Marshall to the Louisiana border.

On June 17, 1918, the segment from Gilmer to Longview had yet to be built, so the road was rerouted over the current US 271 and US 80 routes through Gladewater, Texas.

On August 21, 1923, SH 11 had lost most of its original assignment. The section north of Greenville was transferred to SH 42, the section south to Gladewater was renumbered as SH 65, and the section east of there was transferred to SH 15.  SH 11 was rerouted southeast via current SH 11 to Daingerfield, replacing part of SH 1A, then north on current U.S. Highway 259 to Omaha. On March 16, 1927, SH 11 was rerouted via the current SH 11 to end at Commerce. The section from Greenville to Sulphur Springs became a rerouting of SH 1. On March 19, 1929, SH 11 extended north to DeKalb. On February 8, 1933, it was extended to begin in Ladonia via the present day State Highway 50. On July 15, 1935, the extension from Commerce to Ladonia was cancelled. On November 24, 1936, this extension was restored.

On September 26, 1939 the US 259 segment of SH 11 was cancelled and was transferred to SH 26, and SH 11 was extended from Daingerfield to Linden via its current alignment, replacing SH 47, and up US 59 to a terminus in Texarkana. The US 59 alignment of SH 11 was removed on October 13, 1947 and was transferred to US 59, The Ladonia-Commerce segment was removed as it became part of SH 50, and SH 11 was rerouted on its current assignment on December 17, 1970 over FM 1281 and part of FM 697.

Major intersections

Business routes
SH 11 has one business route.

Business State Highway 11-H is a business loop that runs through Commerce. The road was bypassed in 2009 by SH 11.

See also

 List of state highways in Texas
 List of highways numbered 11

References

External links

011
Transportation in Cass County, Texas
Transportation in Titus County, Texas
Transportation in Morris County, Texas
Transportation in Camp County, Texas
Transportation in Wood County, Texas
Transportation in Franklin County, Texas
Transportation in Hopkins County, Texas
Transportation in Hunt County, Texas
Transportation in Fannin County, Texas
Transportation in Grayson County, Texas